(Alphonse Zoé Charles) Renaud de Vilbac (3 June 1829 – 19 March 1884) was a prolific French organist and composer.

Biography
Vilbac entered the Conservatoire de Paris at age 13 to study the pipe organ with François Benoist and composition with Fromental Halévy. Two years later, in 1844, he won the second "Prix de Rome" with his cantata Le Renégat de Tanger on a text by Claude-Emmanuel de Pastoret.

Returning to Paris after his stay at the Villa Medici in Rome, Vilbac became the holder of the great organ Merklin-Schütz of the église Saint-Eugène-Sainte-Cécile in 1855.

Works

Lyrical works
1857: Au clair de lune, operetta on a libretto by Antoine de Léris, at the Théâtre des Bouffes-Parisiens.
1858: Don Almanzor, opéra bouffe on a libretto by Eugène Labat and Louis Ulbach, at the Théâtre Lyrique.

Music for piano
 Menuet Louis XV, Op. 31
 Ophélia, nocturne
 Petite fantaisie sur la mélodie de Tissot
 Lili-Polka
 Petite poupée chérie, waltz
 Caresses enfantines, mazurka
 Echo du désert, rêverie arabe
 Sonnez clairons, military march
 Caprice Styrien
 Fior di speranza, romance sans paroles
 École complète et progressive du piano, in 7 volumes (Paris: Choudens, c.1871)
 Les Arabesques, Op. 32 (Paris: Heugel, 1871)
 La Neige, mazurka russe (Paris: Léon Grus, c.1871)
 Échos de l'enfance, 12 esquisses musicales (Paris: Enoch, c.1877)
 1re Polonaise (Paris: Enoch, c.1877)
 Deuxième styrienne (Paris: Enoch, 1879)
 Fantaisie sur I Capuleti e i Montecchi by Bellini (Braunschweig: Litolff)
 Fantaisie sur Norma by Bellini (Braunschweig: Litolff)
 Potpourri sur Coppélia (ballet by Léo Delibes), for piano 4 hands (Berlin: A. Fürstner)
 Beautés de Coppélia (ballet by Léo Delibes), 2 suites for piano 4 hands (c.1885)
 Bouquet de mélodies sur La Mascotte, opéra comique by Edmond Audran, 2 suites for piano 4 hands (c.1881)

Music for organ and harmonium
 Perles de l'harmonium, 80 Transcriptions of classical pieces (Braunschweig: Litolff, c.1875)
 L'Orgue moderne, twelve pieces applicable to harmoniums, small and large organs, in 2 series (Paris: Heugel, c.1868)
 L’Organiste Catholique, in 3 vols. (London, Boston, New York, Milan and Paris: Litolff)
Vol. 1: 12 Offertoires, 12 Élévations ou Communions et 12 Sorties
Vol. 2: Antiennes, Versets, Marches, Processions, Préludes
Vol. 3: 12 Offertoires originaux pour les principales fêtes de l'année

External links
  Renaud de Vilbac on Musopen
  Vilbac, Charles Renaud de on Musicalion
 Musica et Memoria Article by Denis Havard de la Montagne.
 
 YouTube Michael Hendron plays Sortie Solennelle of L’Instituteur Organiste on an harmonium Alexandre of the église de la Madeleine, Paris.
 YouTube Michael Hendron joue une Communion solennelle sur un harmonium Debain dans l'église de Mouriès (près d'Arles).
 YouTube Le Calme, n° 14 of the 25 Études Brillantes of the École complète et progressive du piano, vol. 4, by Phillip Sear, piano.

1829 births
1884 deaths
19th-century French composers
Composers for piano
Composers for pipe organ
Conservatoire de Paris alumni
Musicians from Montpellier
French Romantic composers